Heart and Crime is an album by Julie Doiron, released in 2002.

Track listing
"Wintermitts" - 4:10
"Too Much" - 3:21
"Shivers + Crickets" - 2:48
"All Their Broken Hearts" - 3:43
"Sending the Photographs" - 4:18
"I Broke His Heart" - 2:47
"The Surgery is Over" - 3:17
"Who Will be the One" - 2:42
"The One You Love" - 2:49
"I Love to Dance" - 3:12
"It's OK to Stare" - 2:35
"Oh These Walls" - 4:42

References

2002 albums
Julie Doiron albums
Jagjaguwar albums